Henry Patterson Loomis (April 29, 1859 − December 22, 1907) was an American physician who served as president of the American Academy of Medicine.

Early life
Loomis was born in Manhattan on April 29, 1859. He was a son of Sarah Jane (née Patterson) Loomis and Dr. Alfred Lebbeus Loomis, a physician who served as president of the Association of American Physicians.  After the death of his mother in 1880, his father remarried to Anna Maria (née Morris) Prince.  His sister, Adeline E. Loomis, later married their stepbrother John Dyneley Prince in 1889.

He attended Princeton University, graduating in 1880.  He received his medical degree from New York University School of Medicine in 1883, and studied at Heidelberg, Berlin and Vienna before returning to the U.S. in 1887.

Career
He was a leading expert on heart and lung diseases and was a contributor to several medical journals and the author of a number of treatises on diseases. Loomis was professor of pathology at New York University from 1887 to 1895, visiting physician at the New York Hospital in 1896, and consulting pathologist of the New York Board of Health in 1897. He was also a faculty member of Cornell University where he was a professor of therapeutics and clinical medicine.

Personal life
On February 8, 1887, Loomis was married to Julia Josephine Stimson (1861–1933). Julia was a sister of Dr. Lewis Atterbury Stimson, a prominent surgeon (father of U.S. Secretary of State and War Henry Stimson). Together, they were the parents of three children:

 Alfred Lee Loomis (1887–1975), who married Ellen Holman Farnsworth, a sister of Henry Weston Farnsworth, in 1912.
 Julia Atterbury Loomis (1890–1974), who married Landon Ketchum Thorne (1888–1964).
 Henry Loomis, who died of rabies while still a small child; he was bitten by a rabid dog on the street near the family's house in Manhattan.

In the summer of 1907, Loomis's wife filed suit for divorce, claiming that Emilie Grigsby (an heiress of the estate of Charles T. Yerkes) had a relationship with Loomis.  The family were snubbed socially as a result, since a divorce was regarded as a shameful event.

He died of pneumonia on December 22, 1907 at his home in Manhattan before the divorce went through.

Descendants
Through his son Alfred, he was posthumously a grandfather of Alfred Lee Loomis Jr. (an Olympic gold medalist sailor), William Farnsworth Loomis, and Henry Loomis (director of the Voice of America).

References

External links

Henry Patterson Loomis, M.D. at the New England Journal of Medicine

1859 births
1907 deaths
19th-century American physicians
American medical writers
American pathologists
Cornell University faculty
Deaths from pneumonia in New York City
Loomis family
New York University Grossman School of Medicine alumni
New York University Grossman School of Medicine faculty
People from Manhattan
Physicians from New York City
Princeton University alumni